The women's 48 kg judo competition at the 2012 Summer Paralympics was held on 30 August at ExCeL London.

Results

Repechage

References

External links
 

W48
Judo at the Summer Paralympics Women's Extra Lightweight
Paralympics W48